Matthew 19 is the nineteenth chapter in the Gospel of Matthew in the New Testament section of the Christian Bible. The book containing this chapter is anonymous, but early Christian tradition uniformly affirmed that Matthew composed this Gospel. Jesus commences his final journey to Jerusalem in this chapter, ministering through Perea. It can be seen as the starting point for the passion narrative.

Text

The original text was written in Koine Greek. This chapter is divided into 30 verses.

Textual witnesses
Some early manuscripts containing the text of this chapter are:
Papyrus 25 (4th century; extant: verses 1–3, 5–7, 9–10)
Codex Vaticanus (AD 325–50)
Codex Sinaiticus (330–60)
Papyrus 71 (c. 350)
Codex Bezae (c. 400)
Codex Washingtonianus (c. 400)
Codex Ephraemi Rescriptus (c. 450)
Codex Purpureus Rossanensis (6th century)
Codex Petropolitanus Purpureus (6th century; extant: verses 7–12)
Codex Sinopensis (6th century; extant: verses 3–10, 17–25)

Old Testament references
 : 
 : 
 : ; 
 : ; ;

Structure 
This chapter can be grouped (with cross references to the other synoptic gospels):
  = Marriage and Divorce
  = Jesus Teaches on eunuchs
  = Jesus Blesses the Little Children
  = Jesus Counsels the Rich Young Ruler
  = With God All Things Are Possible

Locations
The events recorded in this chapter took place in Galilee and Judea beyond the Jordan (Perea), before Jesus and his party later enter Jericho, on their way to Jerusalem. Jesus leaves Galilee at this stage in Matthew's narrative: the Jamieson-Fausset-Brown Bible Commentary reflects that "few readers probably note it as the Redeemer's Farewell to Galilee". He does not return there until after his resurrection from the dead. Subsequently, the announcement of the angels that Jesus has risen (Matthew 28:7), Jesus' own greeting to the women who meet him (Matthew 28:10) and the final words of Matthew's gospel, the final appearance of Jesus and his commission to "make disciples of all the nations" (Matthew 28:19) all refer back to the Galilee, which Jesus leaves at this time.

In , after blessing the little children, Jesus "departed from there", but no indication is given of where he went. The Jerusalem Bible renders this text as "[Jesus] went on his way". The writer of the Pulpit Commentary confidently asserts that at this point Jesus "set out from Peraea, journeying towards Jerusalem", and theologian John Gill agrees with this interpretation. In  the rich young man "went away" from his encounter with Jesus, leaving Jesus to speak with his disciples about the difficulty faced by "a rich man [wishing] to enter the kingdom of heaven".

Verse 2
And great multitudes followed Him, and He healed them there.
Johann Bengel notes that "there" is not specific: it refers to many places where cures were performed.

Verse 3
Some Pharisees came to him to test him. They asked, "Is it lawful for a man to divorce his wife for any and every reason?"
Jesus' teaching on divorce has already been set out in the Sermon on the Mount, but here the teaching is further elucidated.

Verse 10
His disciples said to Him, "If such is the case of the man with his wife, it is better not to marry".
The  (ou sympherei gamēsai) may be translated as "it is better not to marry" or "it is not better to marry". Arthur Carr, in the Cambridge Bible for Schools and Colleges, describes Jesus' ruling as "a revolution in thought brought to pass by Christ".

Verses 16–24
If you want to be perfect, go, sell your possessions and give to the poor, and you will have treasure in heaven. Then come, follow me.
These verses convey the episode of Jesus and the rich young man, concluding with "it is easier for a camel to go through the eye of a needle than for the rich to enter into the Kingdom of Heaven".

Verses 25-26
25 The disciples were staggered. “Then who has any chance at all?”

26 Jesus looked hard at them and said, “No chance at all if you think you can pull it off yourself. Every chance in the world if you trust God to do it.”

Arts 

The events of this chapter are combined in Rembrandt's Hundred Guilder Print.

See also 
 Galilee
 Jordan
 Judea
 Moses
 Ten Commandments
 Other related Bible parts: Genesis 1, Genesis 2, Exodus 20, Leviticus 19, Deuteronomy 5, Malachi 2, Mark 10, Luke 18, 1 Corinthians 7

References

External links
 King James Bible - Wikisource
English Translation with Parallel Latin Vulgate
Online Bible at GospelHall.org (ESV, KJV, Darby, American Standard Version, Bible in Basic English)
Multiple bible versions at Bible Gateway (NKJV, NIV, NRSV etc.)

Gospel of Matthew chapters